Barjvan (also Romanized as Barjvān; also known as Bajvān) is a village in Barvanan-e Gharbi Rural District, Torkamanchay District, Meyaneh County, East Azerbaijan Province, Iran. At the 2006 census, its population was 64, in 12 families.

References 

Populated places in Meyaneh County